Air Force Base Ysterplaat  is an airbase of the South African Air Force. It is located in Cape Town suburb Ysterplaat, on the southwestern coast of South Africa.
The name Ysterplaat is Afrikaans from the Dutch "Ijzerplaats", meaning "Iron Place" or "Place of Iron" in English.

The base's motto is Fortiter In Re (Resolute in Action).

Units hosted

 22 Squadron SAAF - Helicopter squadron
 35 Squadron SAAF - Transport/Maritime patrol squadron
 110 Squadron SAAF - Light transport (reserve)
 505 Squadron - Security services
 80 Air Navigation School SAAF
 2 Air Support Unit detached - Maintenance support

History

The site of AFB Ysterplaat was originally used as a civilian airfield, known as Maitland Aerodrome, from as early as 1929. African Air Transport (AAT) opened at Maitland in 1938, and was involved in training pilots for the Union Air Training Group's pupil pilot training scheme. 

With the coming of World War II the land the aerodrome sat on was donated to aid the war effort by Sir David Graaff, 1st Baronet on condition his estate would be consulted should it ever be used for non-military purposes.  After which AAT moved to Tempe and Maitland was taken over by the SAAF. On 24 October 1941 Air Force Station Brooklyn, as it was then known, opened as an SAAF unit. 3 and 9 Air Depots were transferred to Brooklyn for the repair and assembly of aircraft. In the first year of its existence, 790 aircraft were assembled at Brooklyn, consisting of 254 Airspeed Oxfords, 154 Miles Masters, 148 Avro Ansons, 79 Harvards, 78 Fairey Battles, 63 Martin Baltimores, nine Bristol Beauforts and five de Havilland Dominies. Curtiss Kittyhawks and Hawker Hurricanes were also assembled at a later stage, but by the end of the war, the depots were now disposing of aircraft for scrap or exporting them. 

In 1946, the first jet aircraft to reach South Africa, a Gloster Meteor III, was assembled and flown at Brooklyn. On 1 April 1949, AFS Brooklyn was renamed AFS Ysterplaat. It lies now literally in the heart of Cape Town, South Africa's legislative capital. More jets were assembled at Ysterplaat from 1950 in the form of the de Havilland Vampire FB Mk.5s, which were the SAAF's first operational jet fighters. Unit status was upgraded to an Air Force Base (AFB) on 1 February 1968.

Current use 
Although the base has long been the centre of the SAAF's maritime patrol activities along the Cape coast, due to increased budgetary restrictions, the base was scheduled to be downgraded to an Air Force Station (AFS Ysterplaat) on 1 April 2003, but as of August 2004, this has not yet happened. The SAAF is considering converting the base into a civilian airport with a military presence, but no decisions have been taken as of yet. However, AFB Ysterplaat restricted airspace helps trainees at local flight training schools based at Fisantekraal or Morningstar Airfield in honing their round-trip skills while flying en route the Cape Peninsula, thus creating strong bonds between the base and the diverse flying community of the Western Cape. The Young Falcons wings ceremony is held also at AFB Ysterplaat.

References

External links

 AFB Ysterplaat

 

Ysterplaat
Ysterplaat
Transport in Cape Town